Bélisaire is a banned 1767 French novel on the life of the Byzantine general Belisarius by Jean-François Marmontel. It popularised the apocryphal tale of his being reduced to beggary by Justinian I despite his great services to the empire, citing it as an example of the ingratitude of those in power towards their faithful servants and indicting the French king Louis XV by proxy as another such ungrateful monarch.

External links
Bélisaire on Gallica

1767 novels
18th-century French novels
French historical novels
Novels set in the 6th century
Novels set in the Byzantine Empire
Novels set in the Middle Ages